N,N-Desmethyltamoxifen is a metabolite of tamoxifen, a selective estrogen receptor modulator (SERM). It is formed from N-desmethyltamoxifen and is an intermediate in the conversion of tamoxifen and N-desmethyltamoxifen into norendoxifen (4-hydroxy-N,N-desmethyltamoxifen), an active metabolite of tamoxifen.

References

Amines
Aromatase inhibitors
Hormonal antineoplastic drugs
Human drug metabolites
Prodrugs
Triphenylethylenes